Lanovychi is a village (selo) in Sambir Raion, Lviv Oblast, in south-west Ukraine. It belongs to Biskovychi rural hromada, one of the hromadas of Ukraine. 

The local Catholic parish was first mentioned in 1462 .

References 

Lanovychi
Populated places established in the 2nd millennium
Year of establishment missing